Team Cologne was a German road cycling team that competed professionally between 1998 and 2002.

Major wins
 Hel van het Mergelland: Raymond Meijs (1998, 1999)
 Ronde van Noord-Holland: Jans Koerts (1999)
 Ronde van Drenthe: Jans Koerts (1999)
 OZ Wielerweekend: Jans Koerts (1999)
 Giro del Capo: Davy Dubbeldam (1999)
 Ster der Beloften: Ralf Grabsch (1999)
 Hel van het Mergelland: Bert Grabsch (2000)

References

Defunct cycling teams based in Germany
Cycling teams based in Germany
Cycling teams established in 1998
Cycling teams disestablished in 2002